James Herbert MacNair (23 December 1868 – 22 April 1955), was a Scottish artist, designer and teacher whose work contributed to the development of the Modern Style (British Art Nouveau style) during the 1890s.

Early life
Born in Glasgow into a military family, MacNair trained as an architect with the Glasgow firm of Honeyman and Keppie from 1888 to 1895, and it was there that he first met Charles Rennie Mackintosh. As part of their training, the two attended evening classes at the Glasgow School of Art between 1888 and 1894, and it was there that they met the MacDonald sisters, Margaret and Frances. MacNair would go on to marry Frances, and Mackintosh would marry Margaret.

The Four
All four later became the loose collective of the Glasgow School known as "The Four", MacNair being the least well known. Influenced by the Arts and Crafts movement, and other European movements such as Symbolism and Art Nouveau, they pioneered the Glasgow Style. MacNair set up his own studio in Glasgow in 1895, where he worked as a designer producing furniture, book illustrations, water colours and posters. MacNair's artistic merits have often been compared unfavourably to those of Mackintosh, but he had significant influence as a teacher following his move to Liverpool in 1898 and appointment as Instructor in Design at the School of Architecture and Applied Art.

In 1899 Frances Macdonald joined MacNair in Liverpool and the two married. The couple painted watercolours and designed interiors, exhibiting a Writing Room at the International Exhibition of Modern Art in Turin. They also exhibited in Liverpool, London, Vienna and Dresden in the early 1900s. Following closure of the School in 1905, and the loss of the MacNair family wealth through business failure, the couple returned to Glasgow in 1909. MacNair's career went into decline from this period, and no works of his are known beyond 1911.

Later life
In 1913 McNair was working in Canada, in a chocolate factory and later a railway company. He returned to Glasgow where he worked as a postman and as a manager in a garage. After the death of his wife in 1921, MacNair destroyed all of their works that he had in his possession. He then moved to an old people's home, where he lived until his death in 1955.

References

Further reading 
 Robertson, Pamela, ed. Doves And Dreams: The Art of Frances Macdonald and James Herbert Mcnair. Lund Humphries Publishers, 2006.

External links 

 Works by MacNair in the Hunterian Art Gallery Collections

1868 births
1955 deaths
19th-century Scottish painters
Scottish male painters
20th-century Scottish painters
Glasgow School
Scottish designers
Art Nouveau painters
Art Nouveau designers
Art Nouveau illustrators
Scottish illustrators
19th-century Scottish architects
Scottish furniture designers
Artists from Glasgow
19th-century Scottish male artists
20th-century Scottish male artists